Bee hotels are a type of insect hotel for solitary pollinator bees. Bee hotels provide a space for shelter and rest for bees that are not part of a hive.

A Canadian study of 200 bee hotels in Toronto indicated that 75% of hotels were dominated by wasps, and recommended that bee hotels be situated in locations that receive morning sunlight, and locations closer to the ground, in order to suits bee's preferences.

Background 

Approximately 30% of the 5,000 native bee species in North America build nests in tunnels or cavities situated above ground. 

The 2021 scientific publication Worldwide occurrence records suggest a global decline in bee species richness indicates a downwards trend in the global bee population. In order to try and reverse the perceived reduction in bee numbers, some people construct bee hotels.

Description 
Bee hotels are man made items that incorporate reeds, bamboo or other materials to create a bundle of horizontal tubes, open at one end, closed at the other. The horizontal tubes are five to eight inches in length, and 1/16 to 1/2 inches in diameter and are all open and closed at the same ends.

Use 
In 2015, Fairmont Hotels and Resorts added 16 more bee hotels at its locations, adding to the five it created in 2014.

Melittological studies 

A study of 200 bee hotels undertaken by melittologist Laurence Packer and Scott MacIvor from York University indicated that 75% of bee hotels in their study were dominated by wasps. Bees, unlike wasps, favour hotels that receive direct (especially morning) sunlight, and that are closer to the ground. Bee hotels located on multi-storey building rooftops and in shaded areas are more likely to attract wasps. The study critiqued poorly designed and maintained bee hotels, noting that plastic tubes can be a catalyst for mould, narrower tubes can discourage female bees, and proximity of spiders can reduce bee populations. Peter Hallett, a melittologist from the University of Toronto noted that the wasps observed in the study were not yellowjackets, but solitary wasps that are generally perceived more positively in North America.

Melittologist Cory Sheffield of the Royal Saskatchewan Museum observed more positive trends in bee hotels used by bees in orchards in Nova Scotia and noted that some of the problems from the Toronto study were unique to cities. Both Cory Sheffield and Laurence Packer encouraged creation of bee hotels, despite the issues identified in the Toronto study.

References 

Insect conservation
Nature conservation
Nature conservation in Canada
Beekeeping